Craspedoxanthitea is a genus of tephritid  or fruit flies in the family Tephritidae.

It contains the following species:

 Craspedoxanthitea flaviseta (Hardy, 1987) 
 Craspedoxanthitea indistincta (Meijere, 1913)

References

Trypetinae
Tephritidae genera